"Wandering Eyes" is a song written by Jamie O'Hara, and recorded by American country music artist Ronnie McDowell.  It was released in December 1980 as the second single from the album Going, Going, Gone.  The song reached #2 on the Billboard Hot Country Singles & Tracks chart.

Chart performance

References

1981 singles
Ronnie McDowell songs
Songs written by Jamie O'Hara (singer)
Song recordings produced by Buddy Killen
Epic Records singles
1981 songs